is a Japanese regional airline headquartered on the property of Miyazaki Airport in Miyazaki, Miyazaki Prefecture, Japan. It operates services mainly between Tokyo and destinations on the island of Kyushu.

History

The airline was established as "Pan Asia Airlines" in 1997 as the fourth airline established in a deregulated Japanese market. In August 1998, the airline's corporate name was changed to "Skynet Asia Airways Co., Ltd." before operations commenced in July 2002. The airline rebranded as "Solaseed Air" in July 2011, and the change of its legal corporate name to "Solaseed Air Inc." followed in December 2015.

In May 2021, Solaseed Air and Air Do announced their intentions to merge as a result of operating difficulties during the COVID-19 pandemic. The new holding company for both airlines, RegionalPlus Wings, was officially established on October 3, 2022.

Corporate affairs

Destinations
, Solaseed Air operates or has operated scheduled services to the following destinations in Japan:

Codeshare agreements
Solaseed Air has codeshare agreements with the following airlines:

All Nippon Airways

Interline agreements
In addition to the aforementioned codeshare partners, Solaseed Air has interlining agreements with the following airlines:

Air Do
Oriental Air Bridge

Fleet

Current fleet

, the Solaseed Air fleet consists of the following aircraft:

Historical fleet

In September 2014, Solaseed Air retired its last remaining Boeing 737-400 aircraft after previously operating a total of ten 737-400s. The airline has since exclusively operated a fleet of Boeing 737-800 aircraft.

Special liveries
In December 2020, the airline repainted one of its Boeing 737-800s in a Pokémon themed livery featuring Exeggutor as part of a tourism collaboration with Miyazaki City and The Pokémon Company, during which Exeggutor became Miyazaki's mascot in the collaboration. The aircraft's maiden flight under the promotional livery traveled from Miyazaki to Tokyo.

Cabin and services
Refreshment services, amenities, and services for families with small children are provided complimentary.

Frequent-flyer program
Solaseed Air's frequent-flyer program is Solaseed Smile Club. Passengers can accrue mileage under the program based on both the fare and route length of Solaseed Air flights.

References

External links

Official website
Official web site 
Skynet Asia Airways fleet

Airlines of Japan
Regional airlines of Japan
Airlines established in 2002
Japanese companies established in 2002
Companies based in Miyazaki Prefecture